Qalaboyun or Galaboyun or Kalaboyun or Kalaboyunlar may refer to:

Qalaboyun, Kalbajar, a village in the Kalbajar District of Azerbaijan
Qalaboyun, Tovuz, a village in the Tovuz District of Azerbaijan

See also
 Qaraboyunlar, a village in Çobansığnaq, Tovuz Rayon, Azerbaijan